At least three ships of the French Navy have been named Tartu:

 , a frigate launched in 1788 as Uranie and renamed in 1793, she was captured by the Royal Navy in 1797
 , a  launched in 1931 and scuttled in 1942
 , a  launched in 1955 and expended as a target in 1998

French Navy ship names